Shur-e Qarah Kand (also Romanized as Shūr-e Qarah Kand, Shūr-e Qareh Kand, and Shūr Qareh Kand; also known as Shūreh Qareh Kand) is a village in Varqeh Rural District, in the Central District of Charuymaq County, East Azerbaijan Province, Iran. At the 2006 census, its population was 353, in 66 families.

See also 

 List of cities, towns and villages in East Azerbaijan Province

References 

Populated places in Charuymaq County